Horestaneh or Harestaneh, also rendered as Horistaneh or Howrestaneh, may refer to:
 Horestaneh-ye Olya